Dunwoody is a surname. Notable people with the surname include:

Ann E. Dunwoody (born 1953), U.S. Army officer, first female four-star general in the United States military
Gwyneth Dunwoody (1930–2008), British Labour politician
John Dunwoody (1929–2006), British Labour politician and husband to Gwyneth Dunwoody
Martin Dunwoody (born 1938), mathematician
Richard Dunwoody (born 1964), Northern Irish jockey
Tamsin Dunwoody (born 1958), British Labour politician and daughter to John and Gwyneth Dunwoody
William Hood Dunwoody (1841–1914), American businessman

Fictional
Benson Dunwoody, protagonist of Regular Show